Per Lindholm (born 13 June 1953) is a Swedish former wrestler who competed in the 1972 Summer Olympics and in the 1976 Summer Olympics. He was born in Hässleholm.

References

External links
 

1953 births
Living people
Olympic wrestlers of Sweden
Wrestlers at the 1972 Summer Olympics
Wrestlers at the 1976 Summer Olympics
Swedish male sport wrestlers
Sportspeople from Skåne County
20th-century Swedish people